Omox lupus, the wolf blenny, is a species of combtooth blenny found in coral reefs in the western central Pacific Ocean, around Papua New Guinea.

References

lupus
Fish described in 1981
Taxa named by Victor G. Springer